Ferdinand Ernst Karl count of Herberstein (died 1720) was a German mathematician and a military officer.

Life 

Son of Karl Sigmund, he lived in Bohemia. He wrote several books about mathematics and geometry. Some of the books are signed using the pseudonym of "Amari de Lapide".

Works 
 Norma et regula statica intersectione circulorum desumta, Praga 1686
 Mathemata adversu umbratiles Petri Poireti impetus propugnata, Praga, 1709
 Diatome circulorum seu specimen geometricum, Praga, 1710
 Erotema politico-philologicum an studium Geometriae rempublicam administranti obstaculo sit an adminiculo?, Praga, 1712
 
 (Amari de Lapide) De machinis pro rei tormentariae incremento etc. tractandis
 (Amari de Lapide) Artis technicae via plana et facilis, Stettino 1736

References 

17th-century German mathematicians
1720 deaths
German military officers
18th-century German mathematicians